Mesocalyptis is a genus of moths belonging to the subfamily Tortricinae of the family Tortricidae. The genus was erected by Alexey Diakonoff in 1953.

Species
Mesocalyptis morosa Diakonoff, 1953
Mesocalyptis zonata Diakonoff, 1953

See also
List of Tortricidae genera

References

 Diakonoff, A. (1953). Verhandelingen der Koninklijke Nederlandse Akademie van Wetenschappen. (2) 49 (3): 73.
 Brown, John W. (2005). World Catalogue of Insects. 5.

External links
Tortricid.net

Archipini
Tortricidae genera